Movie is the second studio album by American recording artist Mod Sun. It was released on March 10, 2017, by Rostrum Records. The album was produced by Don Cannon, Frank Dukes, Mike Dupree, Matt Friedman, Bonny Johnson, Michael Keenan and Arthur Mcarthur.

Background and release 
In summer 2016, Mod Sun started working on Movie stating that "there was a totally different basis to this album" since all of the received instrumentals where from producers, while on his debut studio album Look Up he was composing his own instrumentals. In an interview with St. Louis Magazine's Lance Jordan, Mod Sun revealed that he had recorded over 300 songs for the album and that his team at Rostrum Records helped him with narrowing down the track listing to eleven songs. Movie was released worldwide on March 10, 2017, by Rostrum Records.

Critical reception 

Movie garnered generally positive reviews from music critics. James Shotwell of Substream Magazine stated that Movie is "both intellectually stimulating and unabashedly fun. The so-called inventor of the hippie-hop movement has graduated into the ranks of today’s best rap notables without the budget or major label backing typically required to make such acts a household name." HipHopDX's Aaron McKrell gave the album a positive review stating that "Sun doesn’t offer much creativity in the worn themes of pouring up, flossing, and the opposite sex, he does show versatility in his style."

Track listing 
Credits adapted from Amazon meta data.

Charts

Release history

References 

2017 albums
Mod Sun albums
Rostrum Records albums